Vernonia beddomei is a species of perennial plant in the family Asteraceae. It is endemic to India.

References 

beddomei
Flora of India (region)